Kwiatkówek may refer to the following places in Poland:
Kwiatkówek, Łódź Voivodeship (central Poland)
Kwiatkówek, Masovian Voivodeship (east-central Poland)